The Fat Cat is a  pub at 49 West End Street, Norwich, Norfolk, England.

It was CAMRA's National Pub of the Year for 1998 and 2004.

It is run by the Fat Cat Brewery.

References

External links

Pubs in Norwich